Lukaya may refer to:

 Lukaya, Uganda, a town in Kalungu District, Central Uganda
 Battle of Lukaya, 1979
 Lukaya District, a district in Bas-Congo province, in the Democratic Republic of the Congo
 Lukaya River, a river in the Democratic Republic of the Congo